Sven-Åke is a Swedish first name. It may refer too:

Sven Åke Christianson (born 1954), Swedish professor of psychology
Sven-Åke Jansson (1937–2014), Swedish Army lieutenant general
Sven-Åke Johansson (born 1943), Swedish drummer and composer
Sven-Åke Lundbäck (born 1948), Swedish cross-country skier
Sven-Åke Nilsson (born 1951), Swedish road racing cyclist

Swedish masculine given names